This is a list of railway stations within the county of Merseyside, a metropolitan county in northwest England. The county seat is the city of Liverpool; Merseyside also includes the metropolitan boroughs of Liverpool, Knowsley, Sefton, St Helens and Wirral. It includes all railway stations in Merseyside that currently have regular timetabled train services.

Merseyrail is the name of the commuter rail network and train operating company which provides the majority of local rail services on Merseyside. The Merseyside Passenger Transport Executive, branded Merseytravel, coordinates public transport in Merseyside.  In respect of rail services, it is responsible for awarding the Merseyrail franchise to private operators, and for setting zonal boundaries for season ticket fares. Other regional rail services in the metropolitan county are run by operators such as Northern; Merseytravel also sponsors these services, and the Merseyrail branding is used at the stations which they serve.

Stations currently in use

The following table lists the name and three-letter code of each station, the year it first opened, the metropolitan borough in which it lies, the zone(s) in which it is situated, the train operators who currently provide its services and the number of passengers using the station in the 2014–15 and 2015–16 financial years as collated by the Office of Rail Regulation a Government body.

Zones
The rail network is divided into four lettered areas, which are subdivided into numbered zones:

Fares for weekly and longer-period rail, bus and intermodal season tickets are set according to the number of zones and/or areas passed through. Day tickets are issued between individual stations, however.

The Merseyrail area extends into some adjacent boroughs which are not part of Merseyside; for fare-setting purposes, additional zones F (yellow) and G (orange) cover these. The following non-Merseyside stations are served by Merseyrail trains:

Additionally, Maghull North station is in both Zone C3 and Zone F.

Closed stations

See also
For current stations by borough, see the categories Railway stations in Knowsley, Railway stations in Liverpool, Railway stations in Sefton, Railway stations in St Helens and Railway stations in Wirral.
For current stations by line, see Borderlands Line, Liverpool to Manchester Line, Liverpool to Wigan Line, Northern Line, and Wirral Line.

Footnotes
 Aigburth, Cressington and St Michaels were closed between 1972 and 1978.
 High Level station opened 1874 and closed 1972.  Low Level station opened 1892, closed 1975 and reopened 1977.  Deep Level platform opened 1977.
 Low Level platform opened 1977.

References

External links

Merseyrail website
Merseyrail Network Map
Merseytravel website

 List
Merseyside
Lists of buildings and structures in Merseyside